Rudartsi is a village in Southern Bulgaria. The village is located in Pernik Municipality, Pernik Province. Аccording to the numbers provided by the 2020 Bulgarian census, Rudartsi currently has a population of 1528 people with a permanent address registration in the settlement.

Geography 
Rudartsi village is located in Pernik Municipality, and lies on the western hills of Vitosha mountain, at an average elevation of 786 meters. Until the year 1960, the village existed only as a neighborhood of a nearby village. 

Rudartsi village is located 18 kilometers away from Sofia and 14 kilometers away from Pernik.

Infrastructure 
The village has good infrastructure, a school, a library, and public transport toward Pernik and Sofia. There is a mineral swimming pool in the village alongside mineral springs. There are 10 cafes and restaurant establishments. 

 There is an elementary school in the village - “Sv. Kliment Ohridski” 
 The community hall and library “Vasil Levski” was built in 1968.

Ethnicity 
According to the Bulgarian population census in 2011.

References 

Villages in Pernik Province